The following lists events that happened in 1972 in Libya.

Incumbents
Prime Minister: Muammar Gaddafi (until 16 July), Abdessalam Jalloud (starting 16 July)

Events
 11 June. Muammar Gaddafi announces that any Arab wishing to volunteer for Palestinian armed groups "can register his name at any Libyan embassy will be given adequate training for combat". In retaliation, the United States withdraws its ambassador.

1972–73 Libyan Premier League

 
Years of the 20th century in Libya
Libya
Libya
1970s in Libya